The 2019 California wildfire season was a series of wildfires that burned across the U.S. state of California as part of the 2019 wildfire season. These fires caused 22 injuries, 3 fatalities, and damaged or destroyed 732 structures. The 2019 California fire season was less active than that of the two previous years (2017 and 2018), which set records for acreage, destructiveness, and deaths.

In late October, the Kincade Fire became the largest fire of the year, burning  in Sonoma County by November 6.

Massive preemptive public safety power shutoff events have been controversial. Pacific Gas & Electric, Southern California Edison and San Diego Gas & Electric had preemptively shut off power to 800,000 electric customers to reduce the risk of wildfires by preventing electrical arcing in high winds from their above-ground power lines. While large areas were without power for days, people in fire danger areas had trouble getting information, and critical life support equipment would not work without backup power.

Early projections
Fire behavioral experts and climatologists warned that heavy rains from months early in the year had produced an excess of vegetation that would become an abundance of dry fuel later in the year as the fire season gets underway. According to the US Forest Service and US Department of the Interior officials, early projections indicated that the fire season would possibly be worse than the year prior, stating that "if we're lucky, this year will simply be a challenging one." This assessment was written on the basis of noting that the state has recently been seeing consistently destructive fires more often than ever before.

Wildfires

Other fires

Three people were injured during the Moose Fire (August 12–17). Two people were injured and four structures were destroyed during the Country Fire (September 3–6). Four people were injured during the Lopez Fire (September 21–27), and one during the Electra Fire (September 25). A small brush fire ignited in Pacific Palisades in Los Angeles County on October 21. The fire burned  within a few hours, forcing the evacuation of 200 homes. Three firefighters suffered injuries, while one civilian was treated for respiratory illness.

See also

 Climate change in California
 List of California wildfires

References

External links
 Current fire information  — California Department of Forestry and Fire Protection (CAL FIRE)
 SDSC WiFire Interactive Map — San Diego Supercomputer Center
 Interactive map of active fires in California — LA Times

 
Effects of climate change
California, 2019
2019